George Young (3 March 1909 – 6 August 1972) was a Canadian marathon swimmer who, on 15–16 January 1927, became the first swimmer to cross the channel between Catalina Island and the mainland of California.  This took place during a contest called the Wrigley Ocean Marathon, sponsored by chewing gum and sports magnate William Wrigley Jr.  Young was the only person to complete the  swim, which took him 15 hours and 44 minutes. This feat earned him a prize of $25,000 and the nickname "The Catalina Kid". He was inducted into Canada's Sports Hall of Fame in 1955 and into the International Swimming Hall of Fame in 2014.

Young retired from competitive swimming around 1931. He worked on the Pennsylvania Railroad until the death of his second wife in 1953, and then at the Parks Commission in Niagara Falls until his death in 1972.

See also
 List of members of the International Swimming Hall of Fame

References

External links

 A reminiscence of the Wrigley Ocean Marathon
 
 Wrigley Ocean Marathon Swim

1909 births
1972 deaths
Canadian long-distance swimmers
Sportspeople from Aberdeen
Scottish emigrants to Canada